Kalkeh Jar (also Romanized as Kalkeh Jār and Kalkehjār; also known as Jār) is a village in Obatu Rural District, Karaftu District, Divandarreh County, Kurdistan Province, Iran. At the 2006 census, its population was 223, in 44 families. The village is populated by Kurds.

References 

Towns and villages in Divandarreh County
Kurdish settlements in Kurdistan Province